"Holy Is the Lord" is a song by Chris Tomlin, featured on his album Arriving, that reached No. 2 on the Billboard Hot Christian Songs chart and won the "Worship Song of the Year" award at the 2007 GMA Dove Awards. It reached number thirteen on CCLI's top five hundred worship songs list of 2005, and number seven on CCLI's Top 25 Worship Songs List, as of August 2007.

Appearances
This song also appeared on the Christian compilation album WOW Hits 2006.

Awards 

In 2007, the song won a Dove Award for Worship Song of the Year at the 38th GMA Dove Awards.

Charts

Weekly charts

Decade-end charts

Certifications

References

External links
"Holy Is the Lord" Music Video and Lyrics

Chris Tomlin songs
2004 songs
Songs written by Chris Tomlin